Terrigal, an electoral district of the Legislative Assembly in the Australian state of New South Wales, was created in 2007, with much of the electorate previously being part of Gosford.


Members for Terrigal

Election results

Elections in the 2010s

2019

2015

2011

Elections in the 2000s

2007

References

New South Wales state electoral results by district